Steinheim is an impact crater in the Diacria quadrangle of Mars, on the Arcadia Planitia. The crater was named after the town of Steinheim am Albuch in Baden-Württemberg, Germany, in 2007.

See also 
 Geology of Mars
 Impact crater
 Impact event
 List of craters on Mars

References 

Impact craters on Mars
Elysium quadrangle